Erasmus Darwin (1731–1802) was a physician and poet and grandfather of Charles Darwin

Erasmus Darwin may also refer to:

 Erasmus Alvey Darwin (1804–1881), grandson of Erasmus Darwin, brother of Charles Darwin
 Erasmus Darwin IV (1881–1915), son of Horace Darwin, grandson of Charles Darwin

See also

 Erasmus Darwin House, house of Erasmus Darwin in Lichfield
 Erasmus Darwin Barlow (1915–2005), great-great-great-grandson of Erasmus Darwin
 Erasmus Darwin Keyes (1810–1895), apparently unrelated